Harper is an English, Scottish, and Irish surname that is also commonly used as a given name in the United States.

In some cases, the surname originated from an occupational name, and is derived from the Middle English harper, harpere ("harper"). In other cases, the surname is derived from the Norman le Harpur. The surname can also be derived from the Gaelic Mac Chruiteir ("son of the harper").

Harper is also the Anglicization of the German family name Härpfer, also meaning "harper".

Harper was among the five most popular names for White newborn girls in the American state of Virginia in 2022. it was the tenth most popular name nationally for newborn girls in the United States in 2021. It has also increased in usage as a name for girls elsewhere in the Anglosphere.

Surname

A
Aaron Harper (disambiguation), multiple people
Adam Harper, British mathematician
Adrian Harper (born 1985), Irish footballer
Alan Harper (disambiguation), multiple people
Alec Harper (1910–2003), British soldier
Alexander Harper (disambiguation), multiple people
Alvin Harper (born 1968), American football player
Andrew Harper (disambiguation), multiple people
Andy Harper (born 1967), Australian footballer
Anna McCune Harper (1902–1999), American tennis player
Arthur Cyprian Harper (1866–1948), American politician

B
Bambi Harper, Filipino writer and socialite
Ben Harper (disambiguation), multiple people
Bert Harper (1923–1992), Australian rules footballer
Beverley Harper (1943–2002), Australian author
Billy Harper (born 1943), American jazz saxophonist
Bobby Harper (1920–1980), Scottish footballer
Brandon Harper (born 1976), American baseball player
Brett Harper (born 1981), American baseball player
Brian Harper (born 1959), American baseball player
Brian Harper (engineer), Australian engineer
Brian Harper (priest), Irish priest
Bruce Harper (born 1955), American footballer
Bryan Harper (disambiguation), multiple people
Bryce Harper (born 1992), American baseball player

C
Chandler Harper (1914–2004), American golfer
Charles Harper (disambiguation), multiple people
Charley Harper (1922–2007), American artist and illustrator
Charlie Harper (disambiguation), multiple people
Chris Harper (disambiguation), multiple people
Clifford Harper (born 1949), English anarchist and cartoonist
C. Michael Harper (1927–2016), American businessman
Colin Harper (disambiguation), multiple people
Cullen Harper (born 1985), American football player

D
Daniel Harper (disambiguation), multiple people
Darrell Harper (1938–2008), American football player
Daryl Harper (born 1951), Australian Test cricket umpire
David Harper (disambiguation), multiple people
Dawn Harper (born 1984), American athlete
Dawn Harper (doctor) (born 1963), British television presenter 
Dennis Harper, American businessman
Dennis Harper (footballer) (born 1936), English footballer
Dent Harper (1937–1997), New Zealand cricketer
Derek Harper (born 1961), American basketball player
Deveron Harper (born 1977), American football player
Devin Harper (born 1998), American football player
D. J. Harper (born 1989), American football player
Don Harper (1921–1999), Australian composer
Don L. Harper, American composer and conductor
Donald Harper (1932–2017), American diver
Donald C. Harper (1904–1965), Canadian politician
Douglas Harper (born 1948), American historian
Dwayne Harper (born 1966), American football player

E
Ed Harper (born 1931), Canadian politician
Edward Harper (disambiguation), multiple people
Ella Harper (1870–1921), American circus freak known as "The Camel Girl"
Elijah Harper (1949–2013), Canadian politician
Emily Harper (born 1978), American actress
Emma Harper, Scottish politician
Erastus Harper (1854–1927), American politician
Eric Harper (1877–1918), New Zealand rugby union footballer
Ernie Harper (1902–1979), English athlete
Ethel Ernestine Harper (1903–1979), American actress and singer

F
F. A. Harper (1905–1973), American university professor
Fletcher Harper (1806–1877), American publisher
Frances Harper (1825–1911), American abolitionist and poet
Francis Harper (disambiguation), multiple people
Frank Harper (born 1962), English actor and producer
Frederick Harper (1863–1937), New Zealand cricketer

G
Gavin Harper (born 1986), British technology writer
George Harper (disambiguation), multiple people
Gerald Harper (born 1931), English actor
Glenn Harper (born 1962), Canadian football player
Glyn Harper (born 1958), New Zealand military historian
Goodloe Harper Bell (1832–1899), American teacher and educator
Graeme Harper (born 1945), English television director
Graeme Harper (writer), British writer and critic
Gregg Harper (born 1956), American politician

H
Hannah Harper (born 1982), English pornstar
Harold Harper (disambiguation), multiple people
Harry Harper (disambiguation), multiple people
Heather Harper (1930–2019), Irish operatic soprano
Henry Harper (disambiguation), multiple people
Herbert Harper (cricketer) (1889–1983), English cricketer and umpire
Herbert Reah Harper (1871-1956), Australian electrical engineer
Herbie Harper (1920–2012), American jazz trombonist
Hill Harper (born 1966), American actor

I
Ian Harper, Australian economist
Ida Husted Harper (1851–1931), American author
Irving Harper (1916–2015), American industrial designer

J
Jacey Harper (born 1980), Trinidadian sprinter
Jack Harper (disambiguation), multiple people
James Harper (disambiguation), multiple people
Jamie Harper (born 1989), American football player
Jared Harper (born 1997), American basketball player
J. C. Harper (born 1965), American football coach
Jeremy Harper, American Guinness World Record holder
Jerry Harper (1934–2001), American basketball player
Jesse Harper (1883–1961), American basketball coach
Jessica Harper (born 1949), American actress and producer
Jill R. Harper (born 1972), American molecular biologist and policy advisor
John Harper (disambiguation), multiple people
Jon Harper (born 1978), English musician
Joseph Harper (disambiguation), multiple people
Josh Harper (born 1991), American football player
Justin Harper (disambiguation), multiple people

K
Kalenna Harper (born 1982), American singer-songwriter
Kate Harper (disambiguation), multiple people
Keith Harper (disambiguation), multiple people
Kellie Harper (born 1977), American basketball player and coach
Kelly Harper (born 1979), American recording artist
Ken Harper (disambiguation), multiple people
Kenton Harper (1801–1867), American printer
Kevin Harper (born 1976), Scottish footballer

L
Laura Harper (cricketer) (born 1984), English cricketer
Laura Harper (basketball) (born 1986), American basketball player
Laurie Harper (born 1970), Australian cricketer
Lee Harper (born 1971), English footballer and manager
Leni Harper (born 1954), British actress
Lloyd Harper (born 1949), Guyanese cricketer
Louis Harper (disambiguation), multiple people
Lubbie Harper Jr. (1942–), Justice of the Connecticut Supreme Court
Luellyn Harper, American costume designer
Luke Harper (1979–2020), American wrestler
Lynne Harper (1946–1959), Canadian murder victim

M
Madre Harper (born 1997), American football player
Margaret Harper (1911–2000), American army nurse
Margaret Hilda Harper (1879–1964), Australian pediatrician
Mark Harper (disambiguation), multiple people
Martha Matilda Harper (1857–1950), Canadian-American entrepreneur
Marvin Harper (born 1985), South African field hockey player
Mary C. Harper (1929–2012), American politician and educator
Melinda Harper (born 1965), Australian artist
Michael Harper (disambiguation), multiple people
Mitch Harper (born 1956), American politician
Morgan Harper (born 1998), New Zealand rugby league player

N
Nat Harper (1865–1954), Australian politician
Nathan Harper, American police officer
Nick Harper (disambiguation), multiple people
Norman Harper (born 1957), British journalist

P
Patricia Harper (disambiguation), multiple people
Peter Harper (disambiguation), multiple people
Philip Harper (disambiguation), multiple people

R
Ray Harper (disambiguation), multiple people
Reg Harper, Canadian politician
Rinelle Harper (born 1998), Canadian activist
Rob Harper (born 1955), British musician
Robert Harper (disambiguation), multiple people
Robin Harper (born 1940), Scottish politician
Rod Harper (born 1985), American football player
Roger Harper (born 1963), Guyanese cricketer
Roger Harper (American football) (born 1970), American football player
Roland Harper (born 1953), American football player
Roly Harper (1881–1949), English footballer
Roman Harper (born 1982), American football player
Ron Harper (disambiguation), multiple people
Rory Harper (born 1950), American writer
Roy Harper (disambiguation), multiple people
Ruth Harper (1927–2006), American politician
Ryan Harper (disambiguation), multiple people

S
Sam Harper, American writer
Sam Harper (cricketer) (born 1996), Australian cricketer
Samuel Harper (disambiguation), multiple people
Sarah Harper (disambiguation), multiple people
Scott Harper (disambiguation), multiple people
Shane Harper (born 1993), American actor
Shannon Harper, American author
Shawn Harper (born 1968), American football player
Skinny Bobby Harper (1939–2003), American disc jockey
Stephen Harper (disambiguation), multiple people
Susan Harper (disambiguation), multiple people
Sylvia Lance Harper (1895–1982), Australian tennis player

T
Tanisha Harper (born 1985), Japanese-American model
Ted Harper (1901–1959), English footballer
Terri Harper (born 1996), British boxer
Terry Harper (born 1940), Canadian former ice hockey player
Terry Harper (baseball) (born 1955), American baseball player
Tess Harper (born 1950), American actress
Thomas Harper (disambiguation), multiple people
Toni Harper (1937–2023), American singer and actress
Travis Harper (born 1976), American baseball player

V
Valerie Harper (1939–2019), American actress
Vern Harper (1936–2018), Canadian activist
Virginia Harper (1929-1997), American activist

W
Wally Harper (1941–2004), American composer
Walt Harper (1926–2006), American jazz pianist
Walter Harper (disambiguation), multiple people
Warren Harper (1932–1997), American football coach
William Harper (disambiguation), multiple people
Willie Harper (born 1950), American football player
Winard Harper (born 1962), American drummer
Winnifred Harper Cooley (1874–1967), American author

People with the given name
Harper Goff (1911–1993), American musician
Harper LeBel (born 1963), American football player
Harper Lee (1926–2016), American novelist
Harper Simon (born 1972), American singer-songwriter
Harper Williams (born 1971), American basketball player

Fictional characters with the surname
 Several characters in the American sitcom Mama's Family:
 Ellen Harper
 Naomi Harper
 Thelma Harper
 Vinton "Vint" Harper
 Several characters in the British sitcom My Family:
 Ben Harper
 Janey Harper
 Michael Harper (My Family)
 Nick Harper
 Susan Harper (My Family)
 Several characters in the American sitcom Two and a Half Men:
 Alan Harper (Two and a Half Men)
 Charlie Harper (Two and a Half Men)
 Evelyn Harper (Two and a Half Men)
 Jake Harper (Two and a Half Men)
 Ben "Beanie" Harper, character in the television series Love of Life
 Cally Harper Ewing, character in the television series Dallas
 David Harper (General Hospital), character in the television series General Hospital
 Dick Harper, character in the 1977 film Fun with Dick and Jane and the 2005 remake
 Harry Harper (Casualty), character in the television series Casualty
 Holly Harper, character in the television series Brothers & Sisters
 Jack Harper (disambiguation), several characters
 Jane Harper, character in the 1977 film Fun with Dick and Jane and the 2005 remake
 Jess Harper, character from the 1958 NBC Western series Laramie. Played by Robert Fuller.
 Joe Harper, character in the novel The Adventures of Tom Sawyer by Mark Twain
 Johnny Harper, character in the television series The O.C.
 Kate Harper (The West Wing), character on the television show The West Wing
 Molly Harper, character in the film Final Destination 5
 Owen Harper, one of the main protagonists in the television series Torchwood
 Patrick Harper (fiction), character in the television series Sharpe
 Sally Harper, character in the BBC comedy Coupling
 Seamus Zelazny Harper, character in the television series Gene Roddenberry's Andromeda
 Steven Harper (Boston Public), character in the television series Boston Public
 Ty Harper, character in the television series Neighbours
 Rebecca Harper, character in the television series Brothers & Sisters
 Roy Harper (comics), DC Comics character
Wade Harper, character in two episodes of Walker, Texas Ranger. Played by Robert Fuller.
 Will Harper, character in the television series EastEnders
 William Harper Littlejohn, character in the Doc Savage novels by Lester Dent

Fictional characters with the given name
 Harper Avery, surgeon that the Harper Avery Award is named after and grandfather of Jackson Avery in Grey's Anatomy
 Harper Connelly, title character of The Harper Connelly Mysteries novels by Charlaine Harris
 Harper Dearing, businessman-turned-terrorist and main villain in the 10th season of NCIS
 Harper Decker Simmons, character in the film Parental Guidance
 Harper Pitt, character in the Pulitzer Prize winning Angels in America
 Harper Finkle, character in the sitcom Wizards of Waverly Place
 Harper Lee Burgess, supporting character in the sitcom  Girl Meets World
 Harper Stanhope, character in Lost
 Harper Whitley, character in the New Zealand soap opera Shortland Street
Harper Burke, the eldest child and ten-year-old daughter of Audrey Burke and the late Brian Burke, in Things We Lost in the Fire
Harper Stewart, character in the 1999 film The Best Man
Harper, one of two twin sisters of the Trial Captain Lana in Pokémon Sun and Moon

See also
 Happer (disambiguation)

References

English-language surnames
Scottish surnames
English unisex given names
Irish unisex given names
Scottish unisex given names
Welsh unisex given names